Mount Alfaf (ṭūrāʾ Alfaf), also known as Mount Maqlub (جبل مقلوب in Arabic), is a mountain in the Nineveh Plains region in northern Iraq. The mountain lies 30 km to the northeast of Mosul and some 15 km from Bartella. The largest town on the mountain is Merki, which is inhabited by Syriac Orthodox Christians.

The mountain is famous for the Mar Mattai Monastery which lies close to its southern summit. There exist a number of hermitages that date back to the 4th and 5th century AD, the most important of which are:
Mar Mattai hermitage, where according to Syriac tradition, Sara, sister of Mar Behnam, was miraculously cured of leprosy by Mar Mattai.
Bar Hebraeus hermitage which was occupied by Bar Hebraeus during his lifetime.
The spy's hermitage which lies at the top of the mountain and was used as a sentry to warn the occupants of the monastery of bandits.

See also 
Mount Mar Daniel
Mar Mattai Monastery

References 

Nineveh Plains
Alfaf
Alfaf